Curriculum Vitae is a compilation album by recording artists of Nigerian record label Mo' Hits Records. It was released in 2007, by the label. Nigerian record producer Don Jazzy first revealed plans for a label collaborative album in 2006. Curriculum Vitae was supported by five singles—"Why Me" (Remix), "Pere", "Ololufe", "Booty Call" and "Move Your Body". It received positive reviews from music critics and was ranked seventh on Pulse Nigeria's list of the 15 Best Nigerian Pop albums ever released between 1999 and 2016.

Background
Curriculum Vitae was recorded between 2005 and 2006. Produced entirely by Don Jazzy, the album features appearances from Mo'Hits All Stars, a collective composed of D'banj, Wande Coal, Dr SID, D'Prince and Kayswitch. The album was commercially and critically successful and songs from it still have cultural and pop relevance to date. Curriculum Vitae was made available for digital download on iTunes in 2009.

Track listing

Personnel

Michael Collins Ajereh – executive producer, primary artist 
Dapo Daniel Oyebanjo – primary artist, writer
Oluwatobi Wande Ojosipe – primary artist, writer
Sidney Onoriode Esiri – primary artist, writer
Charles Enebeli – primary artist, writer
Kehinde Oladotun Oyebanjo – primary artist, writer

Release history

References

2007 compilation albums
Albums produced by Don Jazzy
D'banj albums
Yoruba-language albums
Dr SID albums
Don Jazzy albums